Victory Christian School can refer to:

Victory Christian School (Pell City, Alabama)
Victory Christian School (Carmichael, California)
Victory Christian School (Conyers, Georgia)
Victory Christian School (Williamstown, New Jersey)
Victory Christian School (Albuquerque, New Mexico)
Victory Christian School (Sylva, North Carolina)
Victory Christian School (Tulsa, Oklahoma)